Torched is the final recording guitarist Michael Hedges was working on at the time of his death, caused by a fatal car accident on December 2, 1997. It was released posthumously in 1999 on the Windham Hill label.

Reception

Music critic Jason Anderson, writing for Allmusic, wrote the album "In this raw format, the rock influences of Hedges' youth appear most notably in vocal phrasings that are more expressive, almost aggressive at times."

Track listing
All compositions by Michael Hedges.

 "Torched" – 4:51
 "Spring Buds" – 4:20
 "Fusion of the Five Elements" – 3:59
 "Promised Land" – 3:52
 "Phoenix Fire" – 3:40
 "Dream Beach" – 3:51
 "Arrowhead" – 2:17
 "Shell Shock Venus" – 4:14
 "Ursa Major" – 3:45
 "Free Swinging Soul" – 4:19
 "Rough Wind in Oklahoma" – 4:18
 "Sapphire" – 3:48
 "Gospel of Mary/The Holy Flame" – 5:34
 "Java Man" – 3:44
 "Coda: Free Swinging Soul (Live At Lincoln Center, Fort Collins, Colorado - October 16, 1994)" – 5:29

Personnel
Michael Hedges – acoustic guitars, bass, harp-guitar, synthesizers, alto flute, melodeon, percussion, and vocals
Michael Manring – fretless bass
David Crosby – backing vocals on "Spring Buds"
Graham Nash – backing vocals on "Spring Buds"

Production notes
Executive producer - Hilleary Burgess
Mastered by Bernie Grundman

References 

1999 albums
Michael Hedges albums
Windham Hill Records albums
Albums with cover art by Alex Grey

Albums published posthumously